The Holiday Has Been Cancelled is the first EP from the Mad Caddies. It was released on June 6, 2000.

Track listing
 "Falling Down" – 3:09
 "Nobody Wins at the Laundromat" – 1:59
 "Something's Wrong at the Playground" – 2:10
 "Destro" – 2:25
 "S.O.S." – 3:12

Mad Caddies albums
2000 EPs
Fat Wreck Chords EPs